Glenda Dawson High School (DHS) is a public high school in Pearland, Texas, United States. It is a part of the Pearland Independent School District serving grades 9 through 12. In 2014, the school was awarded a national rank of 1,165th by U.S. News & World Report, which puts it in the silver medal category. U.S. News & World Report ranks it 106th in Texas and 895th nationally. In 2015, the school was rated "Met Standard" by the Texas Education Agency.

History 
Dawson, which opened in fall 2007, relieved students from the over-crowded Pearland High School. Dawson serves sections of Pearland, sections of Brookside Village, and unincorporated areas (including Silverlake).  The school was named after former Texas Representative Glenda Dawson, who taught for 34 years at Pearland High School.  The groundbreaking ceremony occurred on August 1, 2007 with the school opening for the start of the 2009-10 school year.  In fall 2007, the current Pearland Ninth Grade Center was converted into a temporary Dawson High School for two years; it served 9th and 10th graders the first year and 9th, 10th, and 11th graders in the second year.

Dawson High School's mascot is the Eagles, the same mascot as Pearland's Challenger Elementary School. Dawson's school colors are red, white, and blue.  

The school was originally designed to house about 2,000 students. On March 8, 2013 the school had 2,110 students. By 2013 the growing enrollment meant that the school could be reclassified into a higher University Interscholastic League (UIL) ranking, affecting the placement of its athletic teams. The district estimated that enrollment at Dawson would reach 2,500 by 2021. In 2015 Pearland ISD administrators told members of the PISD board of trustees that they may want to have another bond election in 2016. In November 2016, the bond passed.

Extracurricular activities

Athletics

The Dawson Eagles compete in these sports

Baseball
Basketball
Cross Country
Football
Golf
Lacrosse
Powerlifting
Soccer
Softball
Swimming and Diving
Tennis
Track and Field
Volleyball
Water Polo

Feeder patterns
The following elementary schools  feed into Dawson - 
 Challenger
 Silvercrest
 Silverlake
 Carleston (partial)
 Lawhon (partial)
 Massey Ranch (partial)

The following middle schools feed into Dawson - 
 Rogers Middle School
 Jamison Middle School (Partial)
 Sablatura Middle School (Partial)

The following junior high schools feed into Dawson - 
 Berry Miller Junior High School
 Pearland Junior High West (Partial)
 Pearland Junior High South (Partial)

Notable alumni 

 Alyah Chanelle Scott, 2015, actress, The Sex Lives of College Girls

References

External links

 Pearland ISD

Pearland Independent School District high schools
Schools in Pearland, Texas
2007 establishments in Texas
Educational institutions established in 2007